The 2021–22 Georgia Bulldogs basketball team represented the University of Georgia during the 2021–22 NCAA Division I men's basketball season. The team was led by fourth-year head coach Tom Crean, and played their home games at Stegeman Coliseum in Athens, Georgia as a member of the Southeastern Conference. The Bulldogs finished the season 6–26, 1–17 in SEC play to finish in last place. They lost to Vanderbilt in the first round of the SEC tournament. The 26 losses set the school record for most losses in a single season surpassing the previous record set by the 1951–52 team.

On March 10, 2022, the school fired Tom Crean after four years as head coach. Three days later, the school named Florida coach Mike White the team's new head coach.

Previous season
In a season limited due to the ongoing COVID-19 pandemic, the Bulldogs finished the 2020–21 season 14–12, 7–11 in SEC play to finish in 10th place. They lost in the second round of the SEC tournament to Missouri.

Offseason

Departures

Incoming transfers

2021 recruiting class

Roster

Schedule and results

|-
!colspan=12 style=| Exhibition

|-

|-
!colspan=12 style=| Non-conference regular season

|-
!colspan=12 style=| SEC regular season

|-
!colspan=12 style=| SEC tournament

Source

See also
2021–22 Georgia Lady Bulldogs basketball team

References

Georgia Bulldogs basketball seasons
Georgia Bulldogs
Georgia Bulldogs basketball
Georgia Bulldogs basketball